Muricy may refer to:

 Muricy (retail store), defunct Brazilian department store
 Muricy Ramalho (born 1955), Brazilian head coach and football player
 Guilherme Muricy (born 1964), Brazilian invertebrate zoologist

See also 
 Maurycy